The half-collared kingfisher (Alcedo semitorquata) is a kingfisher in the subfamily Alcedininae that is found in southern and eastern Africa. It feeds almost exclusively on fish and frequents streams, rivers and larger bodies of water.

The half-collared kingfisher was described by the English ornithologist William John Swainson in 1823 and given its current binomial name Alcedo semitorquata. The word Alcedo is the Latin for a "kingfisher". The specific epithet semitorquata is from the Latin semi- for "half" or "small" and torquatus for "collared". The blue-eared kingfisher is one of seven species in the genus Alcedo and is most closely related to the shining-blue kingfisher (Alcedo quadribrachys).

Description 
The half-collared kingfisher is a medium-sized kingfisher. It has blue upperparts, a white throat and pale orange underparts. The head has alternating light blue and dark blue bands running across the crown and each side of the neck has a creamy white stripe. The dark blue patches on either side of the neck form a half collar. The legs and feet are red. The sexes are very similar but the bill of the male is entirely black while the female has some red at the base of the lower mandible.

References

External links

 Half-collared kingfisher - Species text in The Atlas of Southern African Birds.
 Animal Diversity Web's Taxon Tree

half-collared kingfisher
Birds of East Africa
Birds of Southern Africa
half-collared kingfisher